Corythomantis is a small genus of hylid frogs endemic to northeastern Brazil. It was monotypic until description of a second species, Corythomantis galeata, in 2012. These frogs are sometimes known under common name Greening's frogs.

Species
There are two species in this genus:
 Corythomantis galeata Pombal, Menezes, Fontes, Nunes, Rocha, and Van Sluys, 2012
 Corythomantis greeningi Boulenger, 1896

References

 
Hylidae
Amphibians of South America
Endemic fauna of Brazil
Taxa named by George Albert Boulenger
Taxonomy articles created by Polbot